Wild Down Under is a BBC nature documentary series exploring the natural history of the Australasian continent, first transmitted in the UK on BBC Two in September 2003. It was broadcast in Australia under the title Wild Australasia in February 2004.

Each of the six episodes features a particular environment and, using a combination of aerial photography and traditional wildlife footage, reveals how physical forces and human activity have transformed Australasia from a lush green wilderness into an increasingly dry and harsh continent, troubled by unpredictable weather but still home to a huge array of creatures found nowhere else on Earth..

Wild Down Under was co-produced by the BBC Natural History Unit, the Australian Broadcasting Corporation (ABC) and Animal Planet. The series was produced for the BBC by Neil Nightingale and executive-produced for ABC by Dione Gilmour. The music was composed by Adrian Johnston and performed by the BBC Concert Orchestra. The series was narrated by Australian actor Matt Day.

The series forms part of the Natural History Unit's Continents strand. It was preceded by Wild New World in 2002 and followed by Europe: A Natural History in 2005.

Production 
Wild Down Under is one of the most comprehensive surveys of Australasia's natural history ever filmed, with production of the series taking three years. The aerial photography used extensively in the series was shot by Damon Smith.

As well as mainland Australia, the production team visited other locations across the continent for the fifth episode, "Island Arks", including New Guinea, New Caledonia, Lord Howe Island and New Zealand.

Episodes 

Broadcast dates refer to the original UK transmission.

Merchandise 
A DVD and book were released to accompany the TV series:

 A Region 2 and 4, 2-disc DVD set (BBCDVD1321) featuring all six full-length episodes was released on 27 October 2003. The bonus features on the DVD include an edition of Wildlife on One (Possums – Tales of the Unexpected), a fact file and the featurette Wild – Penguin Paradise. A Region 4 DVD with the same content was released under the title Wild Australasia in 2004.
 The accompanying hardcover book, Wild Down Under by Neil Nightingale, Mary Summerill, Hugh Pearson and Jeni Cleversy, was published by BBC Books on 18 September 2003. The foreword is written by Tim Flannery. In Australia the book was released under the title Wild Australasia.

References

External links 
 
 
 
 Wild Australasia at ABC Online

BBC television documentaries
Documentary films about nature
2003 British television series debuts
2003 British television series endings